Francis Vielé-Griffin (pseudonym of Egbert Ludovicus Viélé, May 26, 1864November 12, 1937), was a French symbolist poet. He was born at Norfolk, Virginia, USA, the son of General Egbert Ludovicus Viele, and moved to France with his mother (the former Teresa Griffin) in 1872.

Vielé-Griffin was educated in France and divided his time between Paris and Touraine.  He was a writer of vers libre and founded the highly influential journal Entretiens politiques et littéraires (1890–92).
He wrote symbolist and vers-libre poetry. His first collection, Cueille d'avril, appeared in 1885. He practiced a relaxed prosody, which did not take into account the obligatory alternation of masculine and feminine rhymes, the prohibition to rhyme a plural with a singular, replaces the rhyme with an assonance, if not neglected here and there the rhyme or assonancer:

Works
His work includes:
Cueille d'avril (1885) (Cull of April, in English translation by Sunny Lou Publishing: , 2021)
Les Cygnes (1887; new series, 1892) (Swans, in English translation by Sunny Lou Publishing: , 2022)
 Ancaeus (1885-87), a dramatic poem
Joies (1889) (Joys, in English translation by Sunny Lou Publishing: , 2022)
 Fleurs du Chemin et Chansons de la Route 
La Chevauchée d'Yeldis (1893)
Swanhilde, a dramatic poem (1894)
Laus Veneris (1895), a volume of translations from Swinburne
Poèmes et Poésies (1895), a collection containing much of his earlier work
Phocas le jardinier (1898)
La Légende ailee de Wieland le Forgeron (1899), a dramatic poem.
L'Amour sacré (1903), poems
 Plus loin (1906)
 Voix d'Ionie (1914)
 La Rose au flat (1922)
 Le Livre des reines (1929)

Quotes
From “Euphonies” in Cull of April:

 

From "Dea" in Cull of April:

References

Attribution
\

External links

 Poems by Francis Vielé-Griffin
 Une conquête morale (1907)
 Francis Vielé-Griffin on French Wiki
 
 
 Jean Rousselot. Dictionnaire de la poesie francaise contemporaine 1968, Auge, Guillon, Hollier -Larousse, Mooreau et Cie.-Librairie Larousse, Paris 

1864 births
1937 deaths
American expatriates in France
American male poets
French male poets
American poets in French
American writers in French
American people of French descent
Writers from Norfolk, Virginia
Symbolist poets
Poets from Virginia
19th-century American poets
19th-century French poets
20th-century American poets
20th-century French poets
19th-century American male writers
20th-century American male writers